M&S may stand for:

Companies

Marks & Spencer, a British department store established in 1884
M&S, former name of Dutch fashion retailer MS Mode
McCormick & Schmick's, American seafood restaurant chain

Music

M&S (production team), British house music production duo

Other uses
Mario & Sonic
Modeling and simulation
Mud and snow tires

See also 
MS (disambiguation)
S&M (disambiguation)
M/S